The third season of Objetivo Fama, the Puerto Rican singing talent contest, began on February 11, 2006. This season the judges are Roberto Sueiro, Hilda Ramos, and Fernando Allende. The show was hosted by Mexican singer Yuri.

Final Cutdown

Out of each audition, a group of semi-finalists were selected. Producers and judges then evaluated each and ended up selecting 20 contestants.

The 20 selected contestants were:

* Age was taken at the beginning of the contest (2006)

Weekly Shows

Quarter-finals

First Show: February 11
The songs performed during the first show were:

The two threatened competitors of the night were: Guadalupe Castro and Sunel Molina.

Second Show: February 18
The songs performed during the second show were:

Guadalupe Castro was selected by the audience to leave the competition, while Sunel Molina got another chance to stay in the show.

The judges harshly criticized Guadalupe and Gustavo's performance of "La Tortura". Hence, Gustavo was threatened to leave the show together with ???.

Third Show: February 25
The songs performed during the third show were:

Gustavo Gutiérrez was selected by the audience to leave the competition, while ??? got another chance to stay in the show.

Elionaid Iñiguez and ??? were threatened to leave the competition.

Weekly Shows
The weekly shows began on February 11, 2006, and are held at the Centro de Bellas Artes of Caguas. Each presentation opens with a huge dance/sing number where all the contestants participate.

Before each presentation, contestants are interviewed by host Yuri, while they present some of the things that happened the preceding week. After the contestants presentation, the three judges evaluate his performance. Guest judges might be brought from time to time.

Threatenings and Eliminations
Each week, based on the contestants performances, the judges threaten a maximum of three contestants to abandon the competition. In the first weeks, the professors "save" one of them based on their week's performance during rehearses. The remaining threatened contestants are then subject to the evaluation of the public during the next week, where the audience has the right to vote for who they want to stay or leave. The results are announced in the next show.

"Con tus Estrellas en Vivo" (2006)

Con tus Estrellas en Vivo is the third compilation album recorded by the reality show Objetivo Fama at their Third Season. The first and only single of this album are "Kilometros", a song of the duo "Sin Bandera", here, interpreted by Arquimides Gonzales and Marlon Fernández (winner of that season).

Track listing
"El Triste" - (Sunel & Arquímides González) - 2:47
"El Hombre que yo Amo" - (Briggitte & Mary Ann Acevedo) - 3:01
"Kilometros" - (Marlon & Arquímides González) - 2:48
"Preciosa" - (Marlon Fernández) - 2:52
"Como abeja al panal" - (Patty & Edwin) - 2:40
"Ahora quien" - (Jose & Francisco) - 2:14
"Para darte mi vida" - (Ronald & Jenilca Giusti) - 2:48
"Todo el año" - (Ediberto) - 1:58
"Dile" - (All) - 2:29
"Nuestro Amor" - (All) - 3:26

Personnel

Vocals – Objetivo Fama contestants
Background vocals – Objetivo Fama contestants

Production

Executive Producer: Ender J. Vega (Acisum Group), Soraya Sánchez
Associates Producers: Angelo Torres,
Pre-Production: Yamilín Rivera, Josema Hernandez-Centeno
Recording studio: "MAS AUDIO" (Toa Baja, Puerto Rico)

Mastering: Papo Sánchez
Photography: Fabián Lira (Univision.com)
Art Direction and design: Guillermo A. Alonso
Fashion "Gurú": Karina Vélez
Stylist & Makeup: Wanda Montes Salón

Controversies
Some controversies that surfaced during the season.
 On April 1, 2006, it was announced that competitor Ediberto Carmenatty had to leave the competition due to medical reasons. The reasons were loosely disclosed, but apparently Carmenatty was suffering from some sort of injury on his back and leg. This was particularly shocking to everybody because Carmenatty was both one of the strongest competitors of the show and one of the most loved by both his fellow competitors and the audience.
 Without a doubt, the biggest controversy so far is the elimination of strong competitor Soledad Sosa from the competition. On March 19, 2006, she decided to quit the competition and abandoned the house with her husband returning to Houston, Texas. Her parents have complained because they've never gotten along with him and have accused him of manipulating Sosa's decision. The production of the show has also inferred that there might be some legal repercussions to her decision because of the contract each contestant signed. Sosa was one of the best singers of the group, receiving always high evaluations from the judges and not being threatened in any of the shows.
 The attitude of some of the contestants has also rose some controversy. More notable were the issues surrounding Sunel Molina during the first weeks, where he argued with many of his fellow competitors and teachers for several reasons. Other contestants that have had problems because of their attitude have been Ronald Martínez and Francisco Salicrup.
 During the third or fourth week of the show, some of the male competitors were reprimanded by Lunna (the administrator of the house/studio) for not waking up early for rehearsals and classes. Some of the competitors reprimanded for this were Marlon Fernández, Edwin Gómez, Arquimides González and José Barraza.
 During the fourth week, it was also brought to attention the poor conditions in which most of the contestants had their rooms. This was shown in the weekly show because Francisco Salicrup complained about the hygiene of his friends.
 Some contestants, namely Josué Muñoz and Helen Ochoa, argued the judge's decisions to threaten them repeatedly in the early shows of the competition even implying that there might be favoritism to other contestants. Josué was eliminated on March 18, 2006.

After the Show

 Season winner Marlon Fernández released his first album titled Mi Sueño in 2006. The album features several songs written by Olga Tañon and a duet with La India. In 2008, he released his second album titled Homenaje a Juan Luis Guerra. He has been nominated to several Billboard Latin Music Awards as well as some Lo Nuestro Awards.
 Third finalist Arquímides González released his first album titled Mil Violines in early 2007.
 Fourth finalist Mary Ann Acevedo was the first contestant to release an album. Her self-titled album was released in mid-2006.
 Jenilca Giusti is about to release her first album and the first single is already on radio.
 Helen Ochoa released a project titled Dos Destinos in early 2007. This project was originally intended to be a dual project with fellow contestant Melanie Figueroa, but the latter dropped from it for health reasons.
 Gustavo Gutiérrez, boyfriend of fellow competitor Jenilca Giusti, is taking acting courses and has already received several offers in Miami and Venezuela.
 Ediberto Carmenatty, Arquímides González, and Mary Ann Acevedo in company of some of the other contestants of Objetivo Fama's 5th Season are now part of a group called "Los Favoritos" and after having a successful show in CBA are having a concert on the Roberto Clemente Coliseum.

External links
 Objetivo Fama Official Page

Objetivo Fama
Mary Ann Acevedo albums
2006 compilation albums